Jay Coles (born December 17, 1995) is an American author of young adult fiction and composer of concert band music and member of ASCAP. His debut piece, entitled "Orchesis: The Legends of Thailand" was premiered in Wakayama-shi, Japan in December 2011. In addition to composing, Jay has written several novels over the years, including the Black Lives Matter-inspired stand-alone, Tyler Johnson Was Here, which was published March 20, 2018 by Little Brown Books for Young Readers.

Biography 
Coles was born in Indianapolis and raised in the Haughville neighborhood. He is a music composer best known for his works published with Carl Fischer Music and C.L. Barnhouse Company as well as his novel Tyler Johnson Was Here.  Jay studied at Vincennes University and Ball State University, respectively, and earned degrees in Liberal Arts, English, and Education. Coles now lives in Muncie, Indiana, where he works for a church geared toward Ball State students and continues to write. Jay Coles presented one of his songs in 2011, when he was 15

Works 
Galactic Episode (Concert Band piece) published by Carl Fischer music (2016)
Insurrection (Concert Band piece) published by C.L. Barnhouse (2016)
Dystopia (Concert Band Piece)
Come As You Were (Young adult novel) published by JC Novels/Createspace
Tyler Johnson Was Here (2018, Little Brown for Young Readers)
Things We Couldn’t Say (Young adult novel) published by Scholastic Press (2021)

References 

 "Book Reviews, Bestselling Books & Publishing Business News | Publishers Weekly." PublishersWeekly.com. N.p., 23 Jan. 2017. Web. 21 Feb. 2017.
"Children's and Young Adult Newsletter 15: October 2016." Dystel, Goderich & Bourret. N.p., 11 Oct. 2016. Web. 21 Feb. 2017.
 "Jay Coles." Carl Fischer Music. N.p., 1 Jan. 2016. Web. 21 Feb. 2017.
 "Jay Coles, Composer." Jay Coles, Composer. N.p., n.d. Web. 21 Feb. 2017.
 "This Week In YA News: Riverdale, King's Cage, And More!" Epic Reads Blog. Web, 01 Feb. 2017. Web. 21 Feb. 2017.

External links 
 Twitter
 Instagram
 Author Website
 Facebook
 Agency Website
 Publisher Website

1995 births
Living people
Writers from Indiana
Musicians from Indiana
Vincennes University alumni
Ball State University alumni
21st-century American composers